Anemosa is a genus of snout moths. It was described by Francis Walker, in 1859, and is known from Australia.

Species
 Anemosa exanthes (Meyrick, 1885)
 Anemosa isadasalis Walker, 1859

References

Chrysauginae
Pyralidae genera